Dishwater Creek is a stream in Montgomery County in the U.S. state of Missouri. It is a tributary of the Loutre River.

According to tradition, the stream was named because a local woman used the stream to wash dishes.

See also
List of rivers of Missouri

References

Rivers of Montgomery County, Missouri
Rivers of Missouri